Ed Bolian is an American auto enthusiast and YouTuber. In 2013, he broke the Cannonball Run Challenge record, with co-driver Dave Black and spotter Dan Huang, for a time of 28 hours and 50 minutes. In 2019 his record was broken, with a team having a time of 27:25. Ed also founded a car-history sharing platform, VINwiki, which has a YouTube channel with over 1.5 million subscribers.

Career 
Bolian went to North Gwinnett High School. In 2004, Bolian and Lee Burrell participated in the AKA Rally, which went from New York to LA. They drove a Audi S4 with their top speed reaching 152 MPH during the rally. Bolian graduated from Georgia Tech with a degree in Mechanical Engineering in 2008. While in college, he started an exotic car rental company, Supercar Rentals, Inc. After selling the fleet in 2009, he moved on to become Lamborghini & McLaren Sales Director at Motorcars of Georgia. He was employed there until November 2015, when he quit. He started VINwiki in February 2016.

VINwiki 
Bolian founded VINwiki, a car-history app, in February 2016. Peter Saddington, Dan Huang, and Dave Black were all co-founders as well. VINwiki is a user-generated content app, where one can add information to a car, to establish a more thorough history. This can come in the form of mileage updates, photos of the car, photos of the service receipts, or general updates. A user finds the given car by entering the VIN, or the license plate.

VINwiki YouTube channel 
On May 30, 2016, the VINwiki YouTube channel was started. The first video was the "VINwiki Founding Team Member Short" released on June 13, 2016. On his channel, he created a series of videos called "Car Stories" in which car lovers come on the channel and talk about their car experiences. Some of the videos on his channel have brought media attention. In April 2020, Jalopnik discussed how the details of a new record-breaking cannonball run was available on VINwiki's YouTube channel. In October 2021, Road & Track talked about the new EV cannonball record, set by Ryan Levenson and Josh Allan, and mentioned how his story of the cannonball was told on VINwiki's YouTube Channel. In January 2022, Road & Track reported on a suspicious Cannonball Run record, and mentioned how the VINwiki YouTube channel changed the video about the attempt to have a disclaimer saying how the driver's claims "are not supported by the traditionally accepted forms of Cannonball evidence and proof".

Cannonball 
In 2013, Bolian broke the Cannonball Run Challenge record with a time of 28:50. The Cannonball Run challenge is inspired from the movie The Cannonball Run, where you drive from New York to LA. He started at Red Ball Garage in New York, and ended at the Portofino Hotel in Redondo Beach, California. His co-driver was Dave Black, and his spotter was Dan Huang. The group drove a 2004 Mercedes-Benz CL55 AMG which was outfitted with two 22-gallon external gas tanks, including the stock tank, the gas capacity totaled at 67 gallons of fuel, or over 400 pounds. The car was selected due to its active suspension, which would help with the extra weight from the fuel. They also added two Garmin GPS units, two iPhone chargers, a police scanner, three radar detectors, rear light kill-switch, fuel tank switch, CB radio, two laser jammers, and a professionally installed switch panel. The spare tire was placed in the back seat, as the trunk had the external fuel tanks. Before the car left, it had a $9000 comprehensive service, and it left with 115,000 miles on the odometer. The car had about 13 miles to a gallon during the trip, which allotted for 800 miles in range. The group left Red Ball garage at 9:56 p.m. on Saturday, October 19. After a rather uneventful cross-country journey, the group arrived at the Portofino Hotel at 11:46 p.m. on October 20, totaling a time of 28:50. The previous record, set by Alex Roy, was beaten by two hours and 14 minutes. The group had an average speed of 98 miles per hour. In November 2019, his record was broken by Arne Toman, Doug Tabbutt, and Berkeley Chadwick. They had a time of 27:25.

Personal life 
In 2008 he and his fiancé Megan Puckett won an abstinence essay contest with a $20,000 wedding prize. Ed married Megan in June 2009. He has two children. He also has a pet Boa constrictor named "Sunny the LamBoa", in reference to Lamborghini.

References 

American car collectors
1980s births
Living people
Georgia Tech alumni
American YouTubers